The lowest natural temperature ever directly recorded at ground level on Earth is  at the then-Soviet Vostok Station in Antarctica on 21 July 1983 by ground measurements.

The result was reported at the 46th annual meeting of the American Geophysical Union in San Francisco in December 2013; it is a provisional figure, and may be subject to revision. The value is not listed as the record lowest temperature as it was measured by remote sensing from satellite and not by ground-based thermometers, unlike the 1983 record. The temperature announced reflects that of the ice surface, while the Vostok readings measured the air above the ice, and so the two are not directly comparable.

Historical progression

This remains the record for a directly recorded temperature.

Laboratory cooling

Early experiments
In 1904 Dutch scientist Heike Kamerlingh Onnes created a special lab in Leiden in the Netherlands with the aim of producing liquid helium. In 1908 he managed to lower the temperature to less than −269 °C (−452.2 F, 4 K), which is four degrees above absolute zero. Only in this exceptionally cold state will helium liquefy, the boiling point of helium being at −268.94 °C (−452.092 F). Kamerlingh Onnes received a Nobel Prize for his achievement.

Onnes' method relied upon depressurising the subject gases, causing them to cool by adiabatic cooling. This follows from the first law of thermodynamics;

where U = internal energy, Q = heat added to the system, W = work done by the system.

Consider a gas in a box of set volume. If the pressure in the box is higher than atmospheric pressure, then upon opening the box our gas will do work on the surrounding atmosphere to expand. As this expansion is adiabatic and the gas has done work

Now as the internal energy has decreased, so has the temperature.

Modern experiments
As of November 2000, nuclear spin temperatures below 100 pK were reported for an experiment at the Helsinki University of Technology Low Temperature Lab. However, this was the temperature of one particular type of motion—a quantum property called nuclear spin—not the overall average thermodynamic temperature for all possible degrees of freedom. At such low temperatures, the concept of "temperature" becomes multifaceted since molecular motion cannot be assumed to average out across degrees of freedom. The corresponding peak emission will be in radio waves, rather than in the familiar infrared, so it is very inefficiently absorbed by neighboring atoms, making it difficult to reach thermal equilibrium.

The Low Temperature Laboratory recorded a record low temperature of 100 pK, or 1.0 × 10−10 K in 1999.

The current apparatus for achieving low temperatures has two stages. The first utilizes a helium dilution refrigerator to get to temperatures of millikelvins, then the next stage uses adiabatic nuclear demagnetisation to reach picokelvins.

Extremely low temperatures are useful for observation of quantum mechanical phases of matter such as superfluids and Bose–Einstein condensates, which would be disrupted by thermal motion.

See also 

Absolute zero
Dilution refrigerator
Highest temperature recorded on Earth
List of weather records
Magnetic refrigeration
Orders of magnitude (temperature)
Timeline of low-temperature technology
Pole of Cold

References

External links 
Details of HUT experiment, including details of the cryostat

Atmospheric temperature
Weather extremes of Earth
Climate and weather statistics